Eternity is the fourth extended play by South Korean girl group April, released on September 20, 2017 by DSP Media and distributed by LOEN Entertainment.

Background and release
In August, the group revealed during an interview with "International BnT" that they were already preparing for their next album, with the goal for a comeback before the end of the year. On August 23, DSP Media announced that the group's comeback was set for some time in September. On September 5, DSP Media announced that the group's comeback had been set for September 20 with an album titled Eternity. On September 5, DSP Media revealed the album's track list, confirming Eternity to be April's fourth mini-album, accompanied by the lead single "Take My Hand".

Commercial performance
Eternity debuted at number 7 on the Gaon Album Chart, on the chart issue dated September 17–23, 2017.

Track listing

Charts

Release history

References

2017 EPs
Korean-language EPs
Kakao M EPs
April (girl group) albums
DSP Media albums